Filip Dort (born 27 July 1980) is a retired Czech football player.

Dort played for several Czech First League clubs. He made his debut in the top league in the 2003-2004 season, while playing for SFC Opava. In his very first season Dort scored 11 goals and was eventually voted "Revelation of the Year" at the Golden Ball awards.

References

External links

Czech footballers
1980 births
Living people
Czech First League players
AC Sparta Prague players
SFC Opava players
FK Chmel Blšany players
FC Slovan Liberec players
FK Teplice players
1. FK Příbram players
FC Vysočina Jihlava players
Sportspeople from Příbram

Association football midfielders